John Sparkes (born 6 January 1954) is a Welsh actor and comedian. He portrayed Barry Welsh, presenter of the HTV Wales series Barry Welsh Is Coming. He has also had major roles in Naked Video, Absolutely, Fireman Sam, Shaun the Sheep, and Jeff Global's Global Probe, and is the narrator of the children's television show Peppa Pig.

Early life
Sparkes was born on 6 January 1954 in Swansea, Wales. He began his working life at Lloyds Bank in Mumbles. After a time as an English teacher, in the 1980s, he turned to comedy and moved to London, becoming an established performer in the first years of London's alternative cabaret circuit alongside Alexei Sayle, Jo Brand, Paul Merton, and Rik Mayall.

Television comedy career

Naked Video and Absolutely
Sparkes starred in the sketch show Naked Video, where he played Siadwel, the geeky South Wales poet who wore an anorak and glasses. The character also appeared when Sparkes was part of the BBC Radio 4 comedy programme Bodgers, Banks & Sparkes.

He was one of the team behind the Channel 4 sketch show Absolutely, which ran for four years between 1989 and 1993. Following an award-winning radio special, a new series for BBC Radio 4 was commissioned for broadcast in September 2015.

Barry Welsh
Barry Welsh Is Coming was a long-running comedy series for HTV Wales. As well as playing Barry Welsh, the hapless host of a chat show, Sparkes also plays other characters within the programme, such as pub singer Gwyn, old Mr. Ffff and Fishguard news reporter Hugh Pugh. Although the series ended in 2004, it returned in 2007 for a series of one-off specials.

Throughout its original run, the series also won four BAFTA Cymru awards for Best Light Entertainment.

Children's television
Sparkes provides the voice of the narrator and some other characters in the children's animated series Peppa Pig, in which the voice of fellow Absolutely star Morwenna Banks is also featured.  In Shaun the Sheep he voices Bitzer the Dog and the Farmer. He also voices Mr. Elf and King Marigold in Ben and Holly's Little Kingdom, Professor von Proton in The Big Knights, Steven in A Town Called Panic, and the lead character Fireman Sam in the 2005 series.

Radio
After killing off Siadwel in Naked Video, Sparkes revived the character in 2014 for a new series of radio shows for BBC Radio Wales, which was recommissioned a year later.

Writing
Sparkes has written and presented three ongoing television series of  Great Pubs of Wales for ITV Wales. He has voiced the unseen character of archivist Goronwy, in a section of Wallace and Gromit's World of Invention for BBC One and has written and presented Ghost Story, in which he spent the night alone with a camcorder in haunted houses around Wales. He has also co-written and presented Doug Strong's Special Places, a factual comedy series for ITV Wales and ITV Central.

Other work
In 2005, Sparkes performed at the Edinburgh Festival Fringe in Absolutely Presents John Sparkes and Pete Baikie with his Absolutely colleague Peter Baikie.

For Welsh television, he starred in Jeff Global's Global Probe (ITV Wales), and he resurrected the character Frank Hovis, originally devised for the Absolutely series, in Pub Quiz (BBC Wales).

Filmography

Film

Television

Theatre

References

External links

1954 births
Living people
20th-century Welsh male actors
21st-century Welsh male actors
Male actors from Swansea
People educated at Gowerton Grammar School
Welsh male comedians
Welsh male television actors
Welsh male voice actors